Prasad Lad is an Indian politician who is a leader of the BJP. He is also the Vice President for the BJP Maharashtra state unit. After Narayan Rane resigned as MLC after leaving the Indian National Congress, Prasad Lad defeated Dileep Mane of the Indian National Congress party by garnering 209 votes to win the bypoll for the seat. Nine Congress and Nationalist Congress Party MLA's cross voted for the BJP candidate.

References

Bharatiya Janata Party politicians from Maharashtra
Living people
Year of birth missing (living people)
Marathi politicians
Indian National Congress politicians from Maharashtra
Members of the Maharashtra Legislative Council